Butterley Reservoir is a reservoir located near Marsden, West Yorkshire, near the Peak District National Park boundary. It was completed in 1906. The reservoir is known for its long stepped spillway, which is grade II listed.

References

Reservoirs in West Yorkshire
Marsden, West Yorkshire
Grade II listed buildings in West Yorkshire
1906 establishments in England